Plagiolepis regis is a species of ant in the genus Plagiolepis. It is native to Russia.

References

Insects described in 1931
Formicinae
Insects of Russia
Taxonomy articles created by Polbot